"Easy Come, Easy Go" is a song written by Jack Keller and Diane Hildebrand that was a hit single for Bobby Sherman in 1970.

The song was first released by Mama Cass Elliot on July 5, 1969, on her album Bubblegum, Lemonade, and... Something for Mama. Bobby Sherman's version was released as a single in January 1970, and appeared on the album Here Comes Bobby, which was released in March of the same year.

Sherman's version spent 14 weeks on the Billboard Hot 100 chart, peaking at No. 9, while reaching No. 2 on Billboards Easy Listening chart. In Canada, the song reached No. 6 on the "RPM 100", No. 7 on RPMs adult contemporary chart, and No. 2 on Toronto's CHUM 30 chart.  The song earned Sherman a gold record.

Chart performance

Weekly charts

Year-end charts

References

1969 songs
1970 singles
Bobby Sherman songs
Cass Elliot songs
Songs written by Jack Keller (songwriter)
Songs written by Diane Hildebrand